Mother and Daughter: The Loving War is a 1980 American TV movie starring Tuesday Weld.

Cast
Tuesday Weld
Frances Sternhagen
Kathleen Beller
Edward Winter
Harry Chapin
Elizabeth Kerr
Melendy Britt

References

External links
Mother and Daughter The Loving War at IMDb
Mother and Daughter The Loving War at BFI
Mother and Daughter the Loving War at Letterbox DVD

1980 films
1980 television films
American television films